This is a lists of schools in the London Borough of Lewisham, England.

State-funded schools

Primary schools

Adamsrill Primary School
All Saints' CE Primary School
Ashmead Primary School
Athelney Primary School
Baring Primary School
Beecroft Garden Primary School
Brindishe Green School
Brindishe Lee School
Brindishe Manor School 
Childeric Primary School
Cooper's Lane Primary School
Dalmain Primary School
Deptford Park Primary School
Downderry Primary School
Edmund Waller Primary School
Elfrida Primary School
Eliot Bank Primary School
Fairlawn Primary School
Forster Park Primary School
Good Shepherd RC School
Gordonbrock Primary School
Grinling Gibbons Primary School
Haberdashers' Hatcham Temple Grove
Haberdashers' Hatcham Temple Grove Free School
Haberdashers' Knights Temple Grove
Haseltine Primary School
Holbeach Primary School
Holy Cross RC Primary School
Holy Trinity CE Primary School
Horniman Primary School
John Ball Primary School
John Stainer Community Primary School
Kelvin Grove Primary School
Kender Primary School
Kilmorie Primary School
Launcelot Primary School
Lucas Vale Primary School
Marvels Lane Primary School
Myatt Garden Primary School
Our Lady and St Philip Neri RC Primary School
Perrymount Primary School
Prendergast Ladywell School
Prendergast Vale School
Rathfern Primary School
Rushey Green Primary School
St Augustine's RC Primary School
St Bartholomews's CE Primary School
St George's CE Primary School
St James's Hatcham CE Primary School
St John Baptist Southend CE Primary School
St Joseph's RC Primary School
St Margaret's Lee CE Primary School
St Mary Magdalen's RC Primary School
St Mary's Lewisham CE Primary School
St Matthew Academy
St Michael's CE Primary School
St Saviour's RC Primary School
St Stephen's CE Primary School
St William of York RC Primary School
St Winifred's RC Primary School
Sandhurst Primary School
Stillness Infant School
Stillness Junior School
Tidemill Academy 
Torridon Primary School
Trinity Church of England School
Turnham Academy
Twin Oaks Primary School

Secondary schools

Addey and Stanhope School
Bonus Pastor Catholic College	
Conisborough College	
Deptford Green School
Forest Hill School
Haberdashers' Hatcham College
Haberdashers' Knights Academy
Prendergast Ladywell School
Prendergast School
Prendergast Vale School
St Matthew Academy
Sedgehill School
Sydenham School
Trinity Church of England School

Special and alternative schools
Abbey Manor College
Brent Knoll School
Drumbeat School
Greenvale School
New Woodlands School
Watergate School

Further education
Christ The King Sixth Form College
LeSoCo

Independent schools

Primary and preparatory schools
The Family Learning School
Heath House Preparatory School
Kings Kids Christian School
Rose House Montessori School

Senior and all-through schools
Marathon Science School
St Dunstan's College
Sydenham High School

Special and alternative schools
Education-My Life Matters
TLG Lewisham
The Young Women's Hub

Lewisham
Schools in the London Borough of Lewisham